The 1983–84 UAB Blazers men's basketball team represented the University of Alabama at Birmingham as a member of the Sun Belt Conference during the 1983–84 NCAA Division I men's basketball season. This was head coach Gene Bartow's sixth season at UAB, and the Blazers played their home games at BJCC Coliseum. They finished the season 23–11, 8–6 in Sun Belt play and won the Sun Belt tournament. They received an automatic bid to the NCAA tournament as No. 9 seed in the Mideast region. The Blazers fell to BYU in the opening round, 84–68.

Roster

Schedule and results

|-
!colspan=9 style=| Regular season

|-
!colspan=9 style=| Sun Belt tournament

|-
!colspan=9 style=| NCAA tournament

NBA Draft

References

UAB Blazers men's basketball seasons
UAB
UAB